The Marion County Railway was a shortline railroad that operated in eastern South Carolina in the mid-1980s.

The line, acquired from Seaboard Systems in July 1984, ran a little more than six miles from Mullins, South Carolina, to Marion, South Carolina.

It operated until February 1985 and while it had not been abandoned as of a decade later, most of the track had been taken up.

References

Defunct South Carolina railroads
Railway companies established in 1984
Railway companies disestablished in 1985
1984 establishments in South Carolina
1985 disestablishments in South Carolina